Chukaly (Sokalı) is a rural locality (a village) in Staroyanbayevsky Selsoviet, Baltachevsky District, Bashkortostan, Russia. The population was 119 as of 2010. There are 6 streets.

Geography 
Chukaly is located 25 km southeast of Starobaltachevo (the district's administrative centre) by road. Starosultangulovo is the nearest rural locality.

References 

Rural localities in Baltachevsky District